Emigrant Peak el. 
is a prominent mountain peak on the western edge of the Absaroka Range near Emigrant, Montana.  The peak is flanked by Emigrant Gulch on the north and Sixmile Creek on the south with the Gallatin National Forest and lies just outside the Absaroka-Beartooth Wilderness.  The peak is readily visible from Paradise Valley, Montana and U.S. Route 89 when traveling to the north entrance of Yellowstone National Park at Gardiner, Montana.

Notes

Mountains of Montana
Mountains of Park County, Montana